The Faroe Islands competed at the 1988 Summer Paralympics in Seoul, South Korea. The islands' delegation consisted in four swimmers: Katrin Johansen, Christina Næss, Johan Samuelsen and Tóra við Keldu.

The 1988 Games were the Faroe Islands' most successful Paralympics ever. Faroese swimmers won the Islands' first and so far only Paralympic gold medal, and also won more medals than at any other Games so far.

Medallists

See also 
Faroe Islands at the Paralympics

References

Paralympics
Nations at the 1988 Summer Paralympics
1988